John Adair McDowell may refer to:

John Adair McDowell (colonel) (1825–1887), American military officer and engineer
John Adair McDowell (major) (1789–1823), American military officer and judge

See also
John McDowell (disambiguation)